Numerology (known prior to the 20th century as arithmancy) is the belief in an occult, divine or mystical relationship between a number and one or more coinciding events. It is also the study of the numerical value, via an alphanumeric system, of the letters in words and names. When numerology is applied to a person's name, it is a form of onomancy. It is often associated with the paranormal, alongside astrology and similar to divinatory arts.

The term numerologist can be used for those who place faith in numerical patterns and draw  inferences from them, even if those people do not practice traditional numerology. For example, in his 1997 book Numerology: Or What Pythagoras Wrought, mathematician Underwood Dudley uses the term to discuss practitioners of the Elliott wave principle of stock market analysis.

Etymology
The term arithmancy is derived from two Greek words – arithmos (meaning number) and manteia (meaning divination). "Αριθμομαντεία" Arithmancy is thus the study of divination through numbers. Although the word "arithmancy" dates to the 1570s, the word "numerology" is not recorded in English before c. 1907.

History 
The practice of gematria, assigning numerical values to words and names and imputing those values with religious meaning, dates back to antiquity. An Assyrian inscription from the 8th century BC, commissioned by Sargon II. declares "the king built the wall of Khorsabad 16,283 cubits long to correspond with the numerical value of his name." Rabbinic literature used gematria to interpret passages in the Hebrew Bible.

The 6th-century BCE philosopher and mystic Pythagoras believed that numbers carried sacred codes and were divinely inspired and created.

In 325 AD, following the First Council of Nicaea, departures from the beliefs of the state church were classified as civil violations within the Roman Empire. Numerology, referred to as isopsephy, remained in use in conservative Greek Orthodox circles.

Some alchemical theories were closely related to numerology. For example, Persian-Arab alchemist Jabir ibn Hayyan (died c. 806−816) framed his experiments in an elaborate numerology based on the names of substances in the Arabic language.

Numerology is prominent in Sir Thomas Browne's 1658 literary Discourse The Garden of Cyrus. Throughout its pages, the author attempts to demonstrate that the number five and the related quincunx pattern can be found throughout the arts, in design, and in nature – particularly botany.

Methods

Alphanumeric systems 
There are various numerology systems which assign numerical value to the letters of an alphabet. Examples include the Abjad numerals in Arabic, Hebrew numerals, Armenian numerals, and Greek numerals. The practice within Jewish tradition of assigning mystical meaning to words based on their numerical values, and on connections between words of equal value, is known as gematria.

Latin alphabet systems 
There are various systems of numerology that use the Latin alphabet. Different methods of interpretation exist, including Chaldean, Pythagorean, Hebraic, Helyn Hitchcock's method, Phonetic, Japanese, Arabic and Indian.

Pythagorean method
In the so-called 'Pythagorean' method (which uses a kind of place-value for number-letter attributions, as does the ancient Hebrew and Greek systems), the letters of the modern Latin alphabet are assigned numerical values 1 through 9.

Chaldean method
A lesser known method, more popular in the nineteenth and early twentieth century, is the so-called 'Chaldean' method; in this context, "Chaldean" is an old-fashioned name for the Aramaic languages. In the Chaldean method number 9 is not used in the calculations, at least in practice. It is left out because it is thought to be divine and sacred, and therefore unassignable.

This method is radically different from the Pythagorean (as well as both the ancient Greek and Hebrew systems) as letters are assigned values based on equating Latin letters with letters of the Hebrew alphabet in accordance with sound equivalents (then number associations being derived via its gematria) rather than applying the ancient system of place-value used by the Hebrew and Greek gematria (although 'place-value' is almost universally interpreted in the ancient world according to units, tens and hundreds, which nonetheless have the same digital root as place value); in consequence of this there are several slightly different versions, there being disagreements over some of the letter-sound equivalents (it doesn't help matters that the Hebrew alphabet has only twenty-two letters whilst the modern English alphabet has twenty-six).

Agrippan method 

Heinrich Cornelius Agrippa applied the concept of arithmancy to the classical Latin alphabet in the 16th century in Three Books of Occult Philosophy. He mapped the letters as follows (in accordance with the Latin alphabet's place-value at that time):

Note that the letters U, J, and W were not commonly considered part of the Latin alphabet at the time.

English Qaballa

English Qaballa (EQ) refers to a system of Hermetic Qabalah that interprets the letters of the English alphabet via an assigned set of values developed by James Lees in 1976. Like most of the systems developed since the death of Aleister Crowley (1875-1947), it was created with the intent of gaining a better understanding of the mysteries elaborated in his inspired works, especially those in Liber AL vel Legis, the Book of the Law. According to Jake Stratton-Kent, "the English Qaballa is a qabalah and not a system of numerology. A qabalah is specifically related to three factors: one, a language; two, a 'holy' text or texts; three, mathematical laws at work in these two."

Chinese numerology 

Some Chinese assign a different set of meanings to the numbers and certain number combinations are considered luckier than others. In general, even numbers are considered lucky, since it is believed that good luck comes in pairs.

Traditional Chinese Medicine (TCM), and its associated fields such as acupuncture, base their system on mystical numerical associations, such as the "12 vessels circulating blood and air corresponding to the 12 rivers flowing toward the Central Kingdom; and 365 parts of the body, one for each day of the year" being the basis of locating acupuncture points.

Related uses 
Scientific theories are sometimes labeled "numerology" if their primary inspiration appears to be a set of patterns rather than scientific observations. This colloquial use of the term is quite common within the scientific community and it is mostly used to dismiss a theory as questionable science.

The best known example of "numerology" in science involves the coincidental resemblance of certain large numbers that intrigued mathematical physicist Paul Dirac, mathematician Hermann Weyl and astronomer Arthur Stanley Eddington. These numerical coincidences refer to such quantities as the ratio of the age of the universe to the atomic unit of time, the number of electrons in the universe, and the difference in strengths between gravity and the electric force for the electron and proton. (See also Fine-tuned universe).

Wolfgang Pauli was also fascinated by the appearance of certain numbers, including 137 (a prime number), in physics.

British mathematician I. J. Good wrote:

See also

References

Citations

Works cited

Further reading

External links

 
 Number symbolism on the Encyclopædia Britannica

 
Divination
Esoteric Christianity
Language and mysticism